The team jumping at the 1980 Summer Olympics took place on 29 July at the Trade Unions' Equestrian Complex.

Results

References

Equestrian at the 1980 Summer Olympics